Rhyd may refer to:

Rhyd, Ceredigion, Wales
Rhyd, Gwynedd, Wales